Charles C. Wilson (November 20, 1864 – 1933), whose full name is Charles Coker Wilson, was an American architect based in Columbia, South Carolina.  
Wilson was born in Hartsville, South Carolina, and graduated from South Carolina College with an engineering degree in 1886, continuing on to receive his master's degree in 1888. He briefly studied architecture in the Atelier Duray at the École des Beaux-Arts in Paris. Much of his work contained Beaux-Arts elements.  Architects who worked for Wilson include Joseph F. Leitner, during 1901–1905, who became a noted architect in Wilmington, North Carolina; and Henry Ten Eyck Wendell, during 1905–1906.

Work
A number of his works are listed on the United States National Register of Historic Places.  Works include:
J. L. Coker Company Building, 5th St. and Carolina Ave., Hartsville, South Carolina
First Presbyterian Church, 234 E. Main St., Rock Hill, South Carolina
Japonica Hall, S. Main St., Society Hill, South Carolina
Logan School, 815 Elmwood Ave., Columbia, South Carolina
Davis College, University of South Carolina.  Columbia, South Carolina
Lydia Plantation, 703 W Lydia Hwy, Lydia, South Carolina
Farmers Commercial Bank, 100 W Main St.,  Benson, North Carolina
Providence Methodist Church, 4833 Old State Rd., Holly Hill, South Carolina
City Hospital-Gaston Memorial Hospital, 401-405 N. Highland St., 810 W. Mauney Ave., Gastonia, North Carolina
One or more works in East Home Avenue Historic District, Roughly, E. Home Ave. from N. Fifth St. to just E of First Ave., Hartsville, South Carolina
One or more works in Waverly Historic District, Roughly bounded by Hampton St., Heidt St., Gervais St., and Harden St., Columbia, South Carolina
 Palmetto Building

Wilson was a principal in the firm of 'Wilson, Berryman & Kennedy.  That firm's works include the following:
 Sanford High School, Former (1924)
 Old Greenwood High School (1925–1926)
 Planters Building (1925–1926)

References

1864 births
1933 deaths
University of South Carolina alumni
American alumni of the École des Beaux-Arts
People from Hartsville, South Carolina
People from Columbia, South Carolina
Architects from South Carolina
19th-century American architects
20th-century American architects